Karczew (Kartshev) is a town in Otwock County, Masovian Voivodeship, Poland, the seat of the urban-rural administrational district of Gmina Karczew, with 10,271 inhabitants (2010).

Karczew is a part of the Warsaw Agglomeration. It is situated on the right bank of Vistula River.

History

Karczew was granted town rights by Polish King Sigismund I the Old in 1548. Administratively it was located in the Masovian Voivodeship in the Greater Poland Province of the Polish Crown.

During the invasion of Poland, which started World War II, Karczew was captured by German troops, who then carried out a massacre of 75 Poles at the local market square on September 11, 1939. Three Poles from Karczew were murdered by the Russians in the large Katyn massacre in 1940.

In 2014 ferries to Gassy started service. According to people working on this project, the main problem was the official "no-entry" car regulation, despite roads being in the vicinity. Without cars it was not economically feasible, and after this problem was solved by removing this rule, the ferries began service.

Sports
It competes in the lower leagues.

References

External links
 Jewish Community in Karczew on Virtual Shtetl
 

Cities and towns in Masovian Voivodeship
Otwock County
Masovian Voivodeship (1526–1795)
Warsaw Governorate
Warsaw Voivodeship (1919–1939)
Nazi war crimes in Poland